Clayton Andrews (born May 15, 1978) is a former left-handed pitcher in Major League Baseball.

Andrews was taken in the third round of the 1996 amateur draft by the Toronto Blue Jays.  His only major league appearances came with the Blue Jays in the 2000 season, where he racked up an ERA of 10.02 in twenty and two thirds innings.  His record in eight games was 1–2 with one game finished.  His lone major league win came on May 28 against the Detroit Tigers at Comerica Park where he pitched four hitless, scoreless innings of relief in a 12-7 Blue Jays victory.

He was traded to the Cincinnati Reds after the 2000 season with Leo Estrella for Steve Parris, and last pitched professionally in 2007 for the Lancaster Barnstormers of the Atlantic League of Professional Baseball.

External links 

Retrosheet

1978 births
American expatriate baseball players in Canada
Baseball players from Florida
Major League Baseball pitchers
Toronto Blue Jays players
Living people
People from Dunedin, Florida
Lancaster Barnstormers players
Lincoln Saltdogs players
Hagerstown Suns players
Northeast League Aces players
Bangor Lumberjacks players